Terry Allen Langford (May 18, 1966 – February 24, 1998) was an American convicted murderer who was executed by lethal injection in Montana. Langford was executed for the July 1988 murders of Ned and Celene Blackwood, in Ovando, Montana. His case was profiled in the true crime television series, Stolen Voices, Buried Secrets.

Early life
Langford was born on May 18, 1966, in Lebanon, Marion County, Kentucky. Not much is known about his early life other than he was a drifter who resided in Raleigh, North Carolina. According to the North Carolina Department of Public Safety, Langford was convicted of forgery and tampering with a motor vehicle in the summer of 1987. As both charges were misdemeanors he received no jail time.

Murders
Terry Langford was convicted of murdering a couple, Ned and Celene Blackwood, in Ovando, Montana, on July 5, 1988. He was sentenced to death for this crime on January 26, 1989. While on death row in Montana State Prison, Langford killed a fellow inmate during a riot on September 22, 1991, in which five inmates were killed. He was convicted of deliberate homicide and given a life term without parole. Langford was acquitted of four other counts of deliberate homcide.

Execution
After waiving his appeals, Langford was executed on February 24, 1998, at Montana State Prison. He declined to make a final statement. At 31 years old, he was the youngest inmate put to death in Montana since the death penalty was reinstated in 1976. Langford remains the second of only three people to be executed in Montana since the resumption of the death penalty. The others were Duncan Peder McKenzie Jr. in 1995 and David Thomas Dawson in 2006.

See also
 Capital punishment in Montana
 Capital punishment in the United States
 List of people executed in Montana

References

1966 births
1998 deaths
20th-century executions by Montana
20th-century executions of American people
American people executed for murder
Executed people from Kentucky
People convicted of murder by Montana
People executed by Montana by lethal injection
People from Lebanon, Kentucky
Suspected serial killers